The 1904 United States House of Representatives elections were held for the most part on November 8, 1904, with Oregon, Maine, and Vermont holding theirs early in either June or September. They coincided with the election to a full term of President Theodore Roosevelt. Elections were held for 386 seats of the United States House of Representatives, representing 45 states, to serve in the 59th United States Congress.

Roosevelt's popularity swept many Republican house candidates into office, cementing their majority over the opposition Democratic Party. Because Roosevelt came from a liberal wing of the Republican Party, his ideology was prevalent among freshman representatives. Progressive Republicanism mobilized a new base of support and proved to be especially popular among the Protestant middle-class workers who held jobs in business or in the front offices of industrial facilities.

Election summaries

The previous election of 1902 saw 3 Independent Republicans elected in the Pittsburgh area of Pennsylvania.

Early election dates
In 1904, three states, with 8 seats among them, held elections early:

 June 6 Oregon
 September 6 Vermont
 September 12 Maine

Special elections 

|-
| 
| George W. Croft
|  | Democratic
| 1902
|  | Incumbent died March 10, 1904.New member elected May 17, 1904.Winner was not a candidate to the next term, see below.
| nowrap | 

|-
| 
| Victor H. Metcalf
|  | Republican
| 1898
|  | Incumbent resigned July 1, 1904 to become U.S. Secretary of Commerce and Labor.New member  elected November 8, 1904.Republican hold.Winner was also elected to the next term, see below.
| nowrap | 

|-
| 

|}

Alabama

Arkansas

California 

|-
| 
| James Gillett
|  | Republican
| 1902
| Incumbent re-elected.
| nowrap | 

|-
| 
| Theodore A. Bell
|  | Democratic
| 1902
|  | Incumbent lost re-election.New member elected.Republican gain.
| nowrap | 

|-
| 
| Victor H. Metcalf
|  | Republican
| 1898
|  | Incumbent resigned July 1, 1904 to become U.S. Secretary of Commerce and Labor.New member elected.Republican gain.Winner was also elected to finish the current term, see above.
| nowrap | 

|-
| 
| Edward J. Livernash
|  | Democratic
| 1902
|  | Incumbent lost re-election.New member elected.Republican gain.
| nowrap | 

|-
| 
| William J. Wynn
|  | Democratic
| 1902
|  | Incumbent lost re-election.New member elected.Republican gain.
| nowrap | 

|-
| 
| James C. Needham
|  | Republican
| 1898
| Incumbent re-elected.
| nowrap | 

|-
| 
| James McLachlan
|  | Republican
| 1900
| Incumbent re-elected.
| nowrap | 

|-
| 
| Milton J. Daniels
|  | Republican
| 1902
|  | Incumbent retired.New member elected.Republican hold.
| nowrap | 

|}

Colorado

Connecticut

Delaware

Florida 

|-
| 
| Stephen M. Sparkman
|  | Democratic
| 1894
| Incumbent re-elected.
| nowrap | 

|-
| 
| Robert Wyche Davis
|  | Democratic
| 1896
|  | Incumbent retired.New member elected.Democratic hold.
| nowrap | 

|-
| 
| William B. Lamar
|  | Democratic
| 1902
| Incumbent re-elected.
| nowrap | 

|}

Georgia

Idaho 

|-
! 
| Burton L. French
|  | Republican
| 1902
| Incumbent re-elected.
| nowrap | 

|}

Illinois

Indiana

Iowa

Kansas

Kentucky

Louisiana

Maine

Maryland

|-
| 
| William H. Jackson
|  | Republican
| 1900
|  | Incumbent lost re-election. New member elected. Democratic gain.
| nowrap | 
|-
| 
| J. Frederick C. Talbott
|  | Democratic
| 1902
| Incumbent re-elected.
| nowrap | 
|-
| 
| Frank C. Wachter
|  | Republican
| 1898
| Incumbent re-elected.
| nowrap | 

|-
| 
| James W. Denny
|  | Democratic
| 1902
|  | Incumbent retired. New member elected. Democratic hold.
| nowrap | 

|-
| 
| Sydney Emanuel Mudd I
|  | Republican
| 1896
| Incumbent re-elected.
| nowrap | 

|-
| 
| George A. Pearre
|  | Republican
| 1898
| Incumbent re-elected.
| nowrap | 
|}

Massachusetts 

|-
! 
| George P. Lawrence
|  | Republican
| 1897 (special)
| Incumbent re-elected.
| nowrap | 

|-
! 
| Frederick H. Gillett
|  | Republican
| 1892
| Incumbent re-elected.
| nowrap | 

|-
! 
| John R. Thayer
|  | Democratic
| 1898
|  | Incumbent retired.New member elected.Republican gain.
| nowrap | 

|-
! 
| Charles Q. Tirrell
|  | Republican
| 1900
| Incumbent re-elected.
| nowrap | 

|-
! 
| Butler Ames
|  | Republican
| 1902
| Incumbent re-elected.
| nowrap | 

|-
! 
| Augustus Peabody Gardner
|  | Republican
| 1902 (special)
| Incumbent re-elected.
| nowrap | 

|-
! 
| Ernest W. Roberts
|  | Republican
| 1898
| Incumbent re-elected.
| nowrap | 

|-
! 
| Samuel W. McCall
|  | Republican
| 1892
| Incumbent re-elected.
| nowrap | 

|-
! 
| John A. Keliher
|  | Democratic
| 1902
| Incumbent re-elected.
| nowrap | 

|-
! 
| William S. McNary
|  | Democratic
| 1902
| Incumbent re-elected.
| nowrap | 

|-
! 
| John Andrew Sullivan
|  | Democratic
| 1902
| Incumbent re-elected.
| nowrap |  
|-
! 
| Samuel L. Powers
|  | Republican
| 1900
|  | Incumbent retired.New member elected.Republican hold.
| nowrap |

|-
! 
| William S. Greene
|  | Republican
| 1898 (special)
| Incumbent re-elected.
| nowrap | 

|-
! 
| William C. Lovering
|  | Republican
| 1896
| Incumbent re-elected.
| nowrap | 

|}

Michigan

Minnesota

Mississippi 

|-
! 
| Ezekiel S. Candler Jr.
|  | Democratic
| 1900
| Incumbent re-elected.
| nowrap | 

|-
! 
| Thomas Spight
|  | Democratic
| 1898 (special)
| Incumbent re-elected.
| nowrap | 

|-
! 
| Benjamin G. Humphreys II
|  | Democratic
| 1902
| Incumbent re-elected.
| nowrap | 

|-
! 
| Wilson S. Hill
|  | Democratic
| 1902
| Incumbent re-elected.
| nowrap | 

|-
! 
| Adam M. Byrd
|  | Democratic
| 1902
| Incumbent re-elected.
| nowrap | 

|-
! 
| Eaton J. Bowers
|  | Democratic
| 1902
| Incumbent re-elected.
| nowrap | 

|-
! 
| Frank A. McLain
|  | Democratic
| 1898 (special)
| Incumbent re-elected.
|  nowrap | 

|-
! 
| John S. Williams
|  | Democratic
| 1892
| Incumbent re-elected.
| nowrap | 

|}

Missouri

Montana  

|-
! 
| Joseph M. Dixon
|  | Republican
| 1902
| Incumbent re-elected.
| nowrap | 

|}

Nebraska 

|-
! 
| Elmer Burkett
|  | Republican
| 1898
| Incumbent re-elected.Resigned before start of term to become Senator.
| nowrap | 

|-
! 
| Gilbert Hitchcock
|  | Democratic
| 1902
|  | Incumbent lost re-election.New member elected.Republican gain.
| nowrap | 

|-
! 
| John McCarthy
|  | Republican
| 1902
| Incumbent re-elected.
| nowrap | 

|-
! 
| Edmund H. Hinshaw
|  | Republican
| 1902
| Incumbent re-elected.
| nowrap | 

|-
! 
| George W. Norris
|  | Republican
| 1902
| Incumbent re-elected.
| nowrap | 

|-
! 
| Moses Kinkaid
|  | Republican
| 1902
| Incumbent re-elected.
| nowrap | 

|}

Nevada

New Hampshire

New Jersey

New York

North Carolina

North Dakota  

|-
! rowspan=2 | 
| Thomas F. Marshall
|  | Republican
| nowrap | 1900
| Incumbent re-elected.
| nowrap rowspan=2 | 

|-
| Burleigh F. Spalding
|  | Republican
| nowrap | 1902
|  | Incumbent lost renomination.New member elected.Republican hold.

|}

Ohio

Oregon 

|-
! 
| Binger Hermann
|  | Republican
| 1903 (special)
| Incumbent re-elected.
| nowrap | 
|-
! 
| John N. Williamson
|  | Republican
| 1902
| Incumbent re-elected.
| nowrap | 
|}

Pennsylvania

Rhode Island

South Carolina 

|-
| 
| George Swinton Legaré
|  | Democratic
| 1902
| Incumbent re-elected.
| nowrap | 

|-
| 
| George W. Croft
|  | Democratic
| 1902
|  | Incumbent retired.New member elected.Democratic hold.
| nowrap | 

|-
| 
| Wyatt Aiken
|  | Democratic
| 1902
| Incumbent re-elected.
| nowrap | 

|-
| 
| Joseph T. Johnson
|  | Democratic
| 1900
| Incumbent re-elected.
| nowrap | 

|-
| 
| David E. Finley
|  | Democratic
| 1898
| Incumbent re-elected.
| nowrap | 

|-
| 
| Robert B. Scarborough
|  | Democratic
| 1900
|  | Incumbent retired.New member elected.Democratic hold.
| nowrap | 

|-
| 
| Asbury F. Lever
|  | Democratic
| 1901 
| Incumbent re-elected.
| nowrap | 

|}

South Dakota 

|-
! rowspan=2 | 
| Charles H. Burke
|  | Republican
| 1898
| Incumbent re-elected.
| rowspan=2 nowrap | 

|-
| Eben Martin
|  | Republican
| 1900
| Incumbent re-elected.

|}

Tennessee  

|-
! 
| Walter P. Brownlow
|  | Republican
| 1896
| Incumbent re-elected.
| nowrap | 

|-
! 
| Henry R. Gibson
|  | Republican
| 1894
|  |Incumbent retired.New member elected.Republican hold.
| nowrap | 

|-
! 
| John A. Moon
|  | Democratic
| 1896
| Incumbent re-elected.
| nowrap | 

|-
! 
| Morgan C. Fitzpatrick
|  | Democratic
| 1902
|  |Incumbent retired.New member elected.Democratic hold.
|  nowrap | 

|-
! 
| James D. Richardson
|  | Democratic
| 1884
|  |Incumbent retired.New member elected.Democratic hold.
| nowrap | 

|-
! 
| John W. Gaines
|  | Democratic
| 1896
| Incumbent re-elected.
| nowrap | 

|-
! 
| Lemuel P. Padgett
|  | Democratic
| 1900
| Incumbent re-elected.
| nowrap | 

|-
! 
| Thetus W. Sims
|  | Democratic
| 1896
| Incumbent re-elected.
| nowrap | 

|-
! 
| Rice A. Pierce
|  | Democratic
| 1896
|  |Incumbent lost renomination.New member elected.Democratic hold.
| nowrap | 

|-
! 
| Malcolm R. Patterson
|  | Democratic
| 1900
| Incumbent re-elected.
| 

|}

Texas

Utah

Vermont

Virginia 

|-
| 
| 
| 
| 
| 
|
|-
| 
| 
| 
| 
| 
|
|-
| 
| 
| 
| 
| 
|
|-
| 
| 
| 
| 
| 
|
|-
| 
| 
| 
| 
| 
|
|-
| 
| Carter Glass
|  | Democratic
| 1902 
| Incumbent re-elected.
| nowrap | 

|-
| 
| James Hay
|  |Democratic
| 1904 
| Incumbent re-elected.
| nowrap | 
|-
| 
| 
| 
| 
| 
|
|-
| 
| 
| 
| 
| 
|
|-
| 
| Henry D. Flood
|  |Democratic
| 1900
| Incumbent re-elected.
| nowrap | 
|}

Washington

West Virginia 

|-
! 
| Blackburn B. Dovener
|  | Republican
| 1894
| Incumbent re-elected.
| nowrap | 

|-
! 
| Alston G. Dayton
|  | Republican
| 1894
| Incumbent re-elected.
| nowrap | 

|-
! 
| Joseph H. Gaines
|  | Republican
| 1900
| Incumbent re-elected.
| nowrap | 

|-
! 
| Harry C. Woodyard
|  | Republican
| 1902
| Incumbent re-elected.
| nowrap | 

|-
! 
| James A. Hughes
|  | Republican
| 1900
| Incumbent re-elected.
| nowrap | 

|}

Wisconsin

Wyoming  

|-
! 
| Frank W. Mondell
|  | Republican
| 1898
| Incumbent re-elected.
| nowrap | 

|}

Non-voting delegates

Oklahoma Territory 

|-
| 
| Bird S. McGuire
|  | Republican
| 1902
| Incumbent re-elected.
| nowrap | 

|}

New Mexico Territory 

New Mexico Territory elected its non-voting delegate November 8, 1904.

|-
| 
| Bernard Shandon Rodey
|  | Republican
| 1900
|  | Incumbent lost renomination and then lost re-election as an Independent Republican.New delegate elected.Republican hold.
| nowrap | 

|}

See also
 1904 United States elections
 1904 United States presidential election
 1904–05 United States Senate elections
 58th United States Congress
 59th United States Congress

Notes

References

Bibliography

External links
 Office of the Historian (Office of Art & Archives, Office of the Clerk, U.S. House of Representatives)